Christopher Hugh Derrick (12 June 1921 – 2 October 2007) was an English author, reviewer, publisher's reader and lecturer. All his works are informed by wide interest in contemporary problems and a lively commitment to Catholic teaching.

Life 
Christopher Derrick was born at Hungerford, the son of the artist, illustrator and cartoonist Thomas Derrick and his wife Margaret ( Clausen) Derrick. His elder brother was Michael Derrick, both were educated at Douai School (1934–39).

Christopher Derrick attended Magdalen College, Oxford (1940; 1945–47), his studies being interrupted by service in the Royal Air Force during the Second World War. In 1943, he married Katharine Helen Sharratt, who graduated from Bedford College the same year. They had nine children, eight sons and a daughter. 

From 1953 to 1965 he was Printing Officer of the University of London, as well as working as a reader for Macmillan. Thereafter he worked independently as a literary adviser to various publishers, as a book reviewer, and as a writer and lecturer. 

He died on 2 October 2007 at the age of 86. His surviving literary papers have been deposited in the archive at Douai Abbey, Berkshire.

Literary career 
Most interest in Derrick has been in his memories of G. K. Chesterton, who was a friend of his father, and more especially C. S. Lewis, who was Derrick's tutor at Magdalen. He was constantly being asked by Lewis's Catholic admirers – such as the German Neo-Thomist, Josef Pieper, two of whose works Derrick had reviewed – why Lewis himself never became a Catholic. He provided as definitive an answer as possible in his 1981 book C. S. Lewis and the Church of Rome. Another friend was the economist E. F. Schumacher, whose interest in Catholic social teaching he shared.

Besides working as a literary adviser to a number of British publishing houses, Derrick was also a prolific book reviewer, among other publications for The Times Literary Supplement as well as for The Tablet, where his brother Michael Derrick was the assistant editor 1938–1961. For a time he was himself the editor of Good Work, the journal of the Catholic Art Association.

His daily occupation as a publisher's reader and a book reviewer meant constant engagement with the emerging trends of literary culture. He drew on this in many ways, including the writing of a book of advice for aspiring novelists: Reader's Report on the Writing of Novels.

Most of Derrick's writings, however, draw less on such literary reminiscences than on reflection on matters of pressing public concern within and outside the Catholic Church in the 1960s, 70s and 80s: the environment, social relations, sexual relations, population, liturgy, ecumenism, inter-religious dialogue, education, and the current state of language and literature. One of the more successful of these books was Escape from Scepticism, a work inspired by the great books programme at Thomas Aquinas College in California.

Books by Christopher Derrick 
 The Moral and Social Teaching of the Church. New Library of Catholic Knowledge vol. 8. London: Burns & Oates. 1964.
 Cosmic Piety: Modern Man and the Meaning of the Universe, edited by Christopher Derrick. New York: P. J. Kennedy & Sons, 1965.
 Light of Revelation and Non-Christians, edited by Christopher Derrick. Staten Island, NY: Alba House. 1965.
 Trimming the Ark: Catholic Attitudes and the Cult of Change. London: Hutchinson. 1969. 
 Reader's Report on the Writing of Novels: a publisher's reader examines the pitfalls facing the aspiring novelist. London: Gollancz. 1969. 
 Honest Love and Human Life: Is the Pope Right about Contraception?. London: Hutchinson. 1969. 
 The Delicate Creation: Towards a Theology of the Environment. London: Tom Stacey Ltd. 1972. 
 Escape from Scepticism: Liberal Education as if Truth Mattered. LaSalle, Ill.: Sherwood Sugden. 1977. . Reissued by Ignatius Press. 2001. 
 Joy Without a Cause: Selected Essays of Christopher Derrick. La Salle, Ill.: Sherwood Sugden. 1979. 
 The Rule of Peace: St. Benedict and the European Future. Still River, Mass.: St. Bede's Publications. 1980. . Reissued 2002. 
 C. S. Lewis and the Church of Rome: A Study in Proto-Ecumenism. San Francisco: Ignatius Press. 1981. 
 Church Authority and Intellectual Freedom. San Francisco: Ignatius Press. 1981. 
 Sex and Sacredness: A Catholic Homage to Venus. San Francisco: Ignatius Press. 1982. 
 That Strange Divine Sea: Reflections on Being a Catholic. San Francisco: Ignatius Press. 1983. 
 Too Many People? A Problem in Values. San Francisco: Ignatius Press. 1985. 
 Words and the Word: Notes on our Catholic vocabulary. San Francisco: Ignatius Press. 1987.

References

External links
 "The Desacralization of Venus" by Christopher Derrick, from America, 12 Sept. 1981
 An extract from Escape from Scepticism
 Extracts from The Delicate Creation (scroll down)
 Derrick's report to the publisher Geoffrey Bles on the manuscript of an edition of C. S. Lewis's Letters
 Archival references for correspondence between Thomas Merton and Christopher Derrick
 Communication of Derrick's death to Ignatius Press, his publisher since 1981, with links to bibliography and comments

1921 births
2007 deaths
20th-century essayists
Alumni of Magdalen College, Oxford
Converts to Roman Catholicism
English essayists
English people of Danish descent
English Roman Catholics
Military personnel from Berkshire
People associated with the University of London
People educated at Douai School
People from Hungerford
Roman Catholic writers
Royal Air Force personnel of World War II